Bartholomew Pearson (fl. 1612 – 1632) yeoman, settler, born in Wollaton, Nottingham, England was one of the group of English settlers of John Guy's colony at Cuper's Cove, Newfoundland who had arrived in 1612, two years after the colony was established.

Pearson was most likely sent by Percival Willoughby to access the agricultural potential of the colony and surroundings. He had found little in the way of establishing a farming business but he did collect much information on the wildlife. Pearson had taken part in John Guy's expedition to Trinity Bay to find and make friends with the Beothuk. On their return trip, the boat was shipwrecked at Bay de Verde. The survivors were forced to walk to Carbonear where they found a boat and finally returned to Cuper's Cove.

Pearson had requested of Willoughby his dismissal from the colony, and returned to England in 1613. He married Elizabeth Baguleughe in 1617.

External links 
 Biography at the Dictionary of Canadian Biography Online
 Baccalieu Trail Heritage Corporation
 Journey to 1612 to find Beothuk's
 Bio of Bartholomew Pearson
 Bartholomew Pearson's letter of 1613

Settlers of Newfoundland
English emigrants to pre-Confederation Newfoundland